Rory Garton-Smith, better known by his stage name Elk Road, is an Australian musician and record producer from Perth. He began remixing tracks from Carmada, Kaskade, Britney Spears and Charli XCX which were uploaded to his SoundCloud account. His debut single "Not to Worry" was released in September 2015 and received high rotation on Triple J. Additional remixes were released in March 2016. His Charli XCX remix of Boom Clap was then used by her during her 2016 arena world tour.

In 2015, Elk Road spoke at the EMC conference on a Copyright Law panel in Sydney.

In 2016, Natalie Foster was featured on the track "Hanging by a Thread" which was later featured in the Triple J Hottest 100, 2016 as one of only three Western Australian tracks to make it in. It was the most played song on Triple J in the month of October 2016. "Hanging by a Thread" was issued as a single with remix versions: Original, Husky, Just a Gent and Flowidus; it peaked at No. 22 on the ARIA Club Tracks chart.

Elk Road has performed at Splendour in the Grass and has been nominated for Most Popular New Act at the West Australian Music Industry Awards.

His Triple J Like a Version of Flight Facilities song "Crave You" was one of the most viewed of 2016 with 2 million streams across YouTube and Facebook.

His track Lights was featured in an Australian Carlton Dry commercial that was broadcast over YouTube and Facebook.

In February 2017, Elk Road joined Porter Robinson and Madeon on the Australian dates of their Shelter Live Tour.

Elk Road is represented by Audiopaxx, William Morris Endeavor and Paradigm Talent Agency.

Discography

Singles

References

External links
 

21st-century Australian musicians
Australian electronic musicians
Living people
Sony Music Australia artists
Year of birth missing (living people)